Sybra multicoloripennis is a species of beetle in the family Cerambycidae. It was described by Breuning in 1971. It is known from Borneo.

References

multicoloripennis
Beetles described in 1971